Home is the second studio album by the Irish rock band Hothouse Flowers, released in 1990. It reached number 5 on the UK Albums Chart and 1 on the Australian charts.

Critical reception 

The Los Angeles Times wrote that "the gospel-influenced rave-ups that punctuate the band's second album call into question how much soul it can squeeze from the boogie". The Windsor Star determined that the band "is best when it rams straight ahead on full-blown horn tunes, like 'Hardstone City' and 'Giving It All Away'".

Jonathan Lewis of AllMusic deemed Home an "underrated gem".

Track listing

Personnel 
Hothouse Flowers
 Liam Ó Maonlaí – piano, lead vocals, Hammond organ, bodhrán
 Fiachna Ó Braonáin – electric and acoustic guitars, backing vocals, bass (6)
 Peter O'Toole – bouzouki, backing vocals, mandolin, bass
 Leo Barnes – saxophone, backing vocals, Hammond organ
 Jerry Fehily – drums, backing vocals, percussion, cymbal

Additional musicians
 Noel Eccles – percussion
 Daniel Lanois – dobro (6)
 Luís Jardim – percussion (9, 10)
 Claudia Fontaine – backing vocals (2, 10)
 Carol Kenyon, The Angelical Voice Choir – backing vocals (7)
 The Camden Kids – backing vocals (8)
 Phillip Pike – didgeridoo (10)
 Nawalifh Ali Khan – fiddle (10)
 Gavyn Wright, Wilf Gibson – violin (2, 8)
 Andrew Parker, Garfield Jackson – viola (2, 8)
 Helen Liebmann, Martin Loveday – cello (2, 8)
 Aisling Drury-Byrne, Dairine Ni Mheadra – cello (11)
 Steve Nieve – Hammond organ and piano (7), string arrangement (2, 8)

Charts

Weekly charts

Year-end chart

Certifications

References 

Hothouse Flowers albums
1990 albums
London Records albums
Albums produced by Clive Langer
Albums produced by Alan Winstanley